Pine Run is a tributary to Neshannock Creek in western Pennsylvania.  The stream rises in south-central Mercer County and flows southeast entering Neshannock Creek south and downstream of Mercer, Pennsylvania. The watershed is roughly 46% agricultural, 45% forested and the rest is other uses.

References

Rivers of Pennsylvania
Tributaries of the Beaver River
Rivers of Mercer County, Pennsylvania